Whitefield Academy may refer to:

United States
Whitefield Academy (Georgia), Mableton, Georgia
Whitefield Academy (Kentucky), Louisville, Kentucky
Whitefield Academy (Missouri), Kansas City, Missouri

Canada
Whitefield Christian Academy (Ontario), Toronto, Ontario